A list of Spanish-produced and co-produced feature films released in Spain in 2016. When applicable, the domestic theatrical release date is favoured.

Films

Box office 
The five highest-grossing Spanish feature films in 2016, by domestic box office gross revenue, are as follows:

See also 
 31st Goya Awards

References
Informational notes

Citations

External links
 Spanish films of 2016 at the Internet Movie Database

2016
Spanish